Deshon Foxx (born November 27, 1992) is a former American football wide receiver that played college football at Connecticut. Deshon Foxx is currently the Assistant Athletics Director at Shenandoah University.

Early years
Foxx attended Brookville High School in Lynchburg, Virginia where he graduated in 2011.

College career
Foxx signed his letter of intent to play for Connecticut on February 2, 2011. Foxx played all four years for the Huskies, playing in 36 games over that span.

Professional career

Seattle Seahawks
On May 18, 2015 Foxx was signed by the Seattle Seahawks after a three-day rookie mini-camp after running a 4.29 forty yard dash at his pro day. On August 13, 2015, the Seahawks waived Foxx to make room for Alex Singleton. On August 24, 2015 Foxx was re-signed by the Seahawks to replace Jeremy Crayton who had just been waived. On August 31, 2015, Foxx was waived as the Seahawks cut their roster to 75 players. On December 1, 2015 Foxx was signed by the Seahawks to their practice squad. On December 8, 2015 Foxx was waived from the practice squad. On December 22, 2015, the Seahawks re-signed Foxx to their practice squad. On January 18, 2016 Foxx was signed to a futures contract by the Seahawks. On August 29, 2016, Foxx was waived/injured by the Seahawks and placed on injured reserve after clearing waivers. He was released by the Seahawks on September 6, 2016 with an injury settlement.

New York Jets
On January 11, 2017, Foxx signed a reserve/future contract with the Jets. He was waived by the Jets on May 9, 2017. He was re-signed by the Jets on May 22, 2017. He was waived on August 14, 2017.

Assistant Athletics Director
In 2018, Foxx served as the assistant offensive coordinator and wide receivers coach for the Loomis Chaffee varsity football team, a prep school in Windsor, Connecticut. He received his masters of science in Sports Management from the University of Connecticut in 2019 and served as the Wide Receivers and Tight-ends coach at Washington and Lee University for the 2020 season. Foxx is currently the Assistant Athletics Director at Shenandoah University located in Winchester, VA.

References

External links
Assistant Athletics Director - Shenandoah University 
Washington and Lee Generals football coaching bio
Seattle Seahawks bio
UConn Huskies bio

1992 births
Living people
Sportspeople from Lynchburg, Virginia
Players of American football from Virginia
American football wide receivers
UConn Huskies football players
Seattle Seahawks players
New York Jets players
Washington and Lee Generals football coaches